In Greek mythology, Anticlus (Ancient Greek: Ἄντικλος Antiklos), son of Ortyx, was one of the Greek warriors who hid inside the Trojan Horse during the siege of Troy.

Mythology 
When the wooden horse was taken within the city, Helen, suspecting a trick by the Greeks, circled the horse imitating the voices of the warriors' wives and sweethearts and calling their names. Anticlus was the only one to not resist and attempt to answer as he heard her talking in the voice of his wife Laodamia, but just as he was on the point of calling out in response, Odysseus shut his mouth with his hands to prevent him from answering, and thus saved his companions. Some say he held Anticlus so tight that he strangled him.

Legacy 
The asteroid 7214 Anticlus is named for the mythological figure.

Notes

References 

 Apollodorus, The Library with an English Translation by Sir James George Frazer, F.B.A., F.R.S. in 2 Volumes, Cambridge, MA, Harvard University Press; London, William Heinemann Ltd. 1921. ISBN 0-674-99135-4. Online version at the Perseus Digital Library. Greek text available from the same website.
 Homer, The Odyssey with an English Translation by A.T. Murray, PH.D. in two volumes. Cambridge, MA., Harvard University Press; London, William Heinemann, Ltd. 1919. . Online version at the Perseus Digital Library. Greek text available from the same website.
 Tryphiodorus, Capture of Troy translated by Mair, A. W. Loeb Classical Library Volume 219. London: William Heinemann Ltd, 1928. Online version at theoi.com
 Tryphiodorus, Capture of Troy with an English Translation by A.W. Mair. London, William Heinemann, Ltd.; New York: G.P. Putnam's Sons. 1928. Greek text available at the Perseus Digital Library.

Achaeans (Homer)